Lin Zhongzai (born 29 August 1981 in Fu'an, Ningde, Fujian) is a male Chinese sports shooter, who will compete for Team China at the 2008 Summer Olympics.

Major performances
2005 World Cup Germany - 1st pistol;
2007 World Cup Final - 1st pistol;
2008 "Good Luck Beijing" ISSF World Cup - 1st pistol

References
 http://2008teamchina.olympic.cn/index.php/personview/personsen/4923

1981 births
Living people
ISSF pistol shooters
Olympic shooters of China
People from Fu'an
Shooters at the 2008 Summer Olympics
Asian Games medalists in shooting
Sport shooters from Fujian
Shooters at the 2006 Asian Games
Chinese male sport shooters
Asian Games gold medalists for China
Medalists at the 2006 Asian Games
21st-century Chinese people